Md Mahbub-ul Alam is a Major General of Bangladesh Army and the incumbent Vice Chancellor of Bangladesh University of Professional. Prior to Joining BUP, he served as Principal of Adamjee Cantonment College. Before that, he served as ADG of Bangladesh Border Guard.

Early life and education 
Alam has MPhil degree in Strategy and Development Studies and PhD degree on Security and Strategic Studies from Bangladesh University of Professional. His second Masters is in Defence Studies from National University. He successfully completed National Defense Course and Armed Forces War Course from National Defense College.

Career 
Alam was commissioned in the Corps of Infantry of the Bangladesh Army on 21 December 1990. He has received training in logistics orientation  in Turkey and brigade commanders course in China. He was a founding member of Army Golf Club.  

Alam served in Border Guard Bangladesh as Additional Director General. At the same time, he was Brigadier General and in National Defence College as Director while he was Colonel. He also served as General Staff Officer in Army Headquarters. As CO of an infantry battalion, he led "Operation Purba Prachir".  

Alam is Board of Trustees of Bangladesh Army University of Engineering & Technology. He is a member of the governing body of the National Defence College. He was appointed Vice Chancellor of Bangladesh University of Professional. He planned to develop Bangladesh University of Professionals by focusing on outcome-based education.

References 

Bangladesh Army generals
Bangladeshi military personnel
Vice-Chancellors of Bangladesh University of Professionals
Year of birth missing (living people)
Living people
Bangladesh University of Professionals alumni
National Defence College (Bangladesh) alumni
National University, Bangladesh alumni